Waterville-Elysian-Morristown School District 2143 is a school district headquartered in Waterville, Minnesota.

It serves the communities of Waterville, Morristown, and Elysian.

Schools
 Waterville-Elysian-Morristown High School (Waterville)
 Morristown Middle School (Morristown)
 Waterville Elementary School (Waterville)

References

External links
 
School districts in Minnesota